"Luv" is a song by Canadian singer and rapper Tory Lanez. It was released on June 9, 2016, as the second single from his debut studio album, I Told You (2016). The song was produced by Cashmere Cat and Benny Blanco. It has interpolations from "Everyone Falls in Love" by Tanto Metro and Devonte. It received a nomination for Best R&B Song at the 59th Annual Grammy Awards that was held in February 2017.

Music video
The music video for "Luv", directed by Lanez and Zac Facts, premiered via Lanez's Vevo channel on June 24, 2016.

Remix
The official remix of the song was released on October 7, 2016, and features Jamaican dancehall artist Sean Paul.
Another remix was made with German rapper Bonez MC.

Chart performance
On the week of July 16, 2016, the song debuted at number 96 on the US Billboard Hot 100 chart and peaked at number 19. It became Tory Lanez' first song to reach the top 20 on the chart. The song spent 22 weeks on the chart.

In Canada, the song debuted at number 96 on the Canadian Hot 100 chart on the week of July 9, 2016. It peaked at number 28 on the chart. The song spent a total of 20 weeks on the chart. The single was eventually certified platinum by Music Canada for sales of over 80,000 units in Canada.

Charts

Weekly charts

Year-end charts

Certifications

References

External links
 

2016 songs
2016 singles
Tory Lanez songs
Interscope Records singles
Dancehall songs
Songs written by Benny Blanco
Song recordings produced by Benny Blanco
Song recordings produced by Cashmere Cat
Songs written by Steven "Lenky" Marsden
Songs written by Cashmere Cat
Songs written by Tory Lanez